Liberty ships were a class of cargo ship built in the United States during World War II under the Emergency Shipbuilding Program. Though British in concept, the design was adopted by the United States for its simple, low-cost construction. Mass-produced on an unprecedented scale, the Liberty ship came to symbolize U.S. wartime industrial output.

The class was developed to meet British orders for transports to replace ships that had been lost. Eighteen American shipyards built 2,710 Liberty ships between 1941 and 1945 (an average of three ships every two days), easily the largest number of ships ever produced to a single design.

Their production mirrored (albeit on a much larger scale) the manufacture of "Hog Islander" and similar standardized ship types during World War I. The immensity of the effort, the number of ships built, the role of female workers in their construction, and the survival of some far longer than their original five-year design life combine to make them the subject of much continued interest.

History

Design
In 1936, the American Merchant Marine Act was passed to subsidize the annual construction of 50 commercial merchant vessels which could be used in wartime by the United States Navy as naval auxiliaries, crewed by U.S. Merchant Mariners. The number was doubled in 1939 and again in 1940 to 200 ships a year. Ship types included two tankers and three types of merchant vessel, all to be powered by steam turbines. Limited industrial capacity, especially for reduction gears, meant that relatively few of these ships were built.

In 1940 the British government ordered 60 Ocean-class freighters from American yards to replace war losses and boost the merchant fleet. These were simple but fairly large (for the time) with a single  compound steam engine of obsolete but reliable design. Britain specified coal-fired plants, because it then had extensive coal mines and no significant domestic oil production.

 The predecessor designs, which included the "Northeast Coast, Open Shelter Deck Steamer", were based on a simple ship originally produced in Sunderland by J.L. Thompson & Sons based on a 1939 design for a simple tramp steamer, which was cheap to build and cheap to run (see Silver Line). Examples include SS Dorington Court built in 1939. The accommodation, bridge, and main engine were located amidships, with a tunnel connecting the main engine shaft to the propeller via a long aft extension. The first Ocean-class ship, SS Ocean Vanguard, was launched on 16 August 1941.

The design was modified by the United States Maritime Commission, in part to increase conformity to American construction practices, but more importantly to make it even quicker and cheaper to build. The new design replaced much riveting, which accounted for one-third of the labor costs, with welding, and had oil-fired boilers. It was adopted as a Merchant Marine Act design, and production awarded to a conglomerate of West Coast engineering and construction companies headed by Henry J. Kaiser known as the Six Companies. Liberty ships were designed to carry  of cargo, usually one type per ship, but, during wartime, generally carried loads far exceeding this.

On 27 March 1941, the number of lend-lease ships was increased to 200 by the Defense Aid Supplemental Appropriations Act and increased again in April to 306, of which 117 would be Liberty ships.

Variants
The basic EC2-S-C1 cargo design was modified during construction into three major variants with the same basic dimensions and slight variance in tonnage. One variant, with basically the same features but different type numbers, had four rather than five holds served by large hatches and kingpost with large capacity booms. Those four hold ships were designated for transport of tanks and boxed aircraft.

In the detailed Federal Register publication of the post war prices of Maritime Commission types the Liberty variants are noted as:
 EC2-S-AW1
 Collier (All given names of coal seams as SS Banner Seam, Beckley Seam and Bon Air Seam)
Z-EC2-S-C2
 Tank carrier (four holds, kingposts) – example 
Z-ET1-S-C3
 T1 tanker – example SS Carl R. Gray. Eighteen were commissioned into USN in 1943 as the 
Z-EC2-S-C5
 Boxed aircraft transport (four holds, kingposts) – example . Post war 16 of these Liberty ships were converted 1954–1958 into 

In preparation for the Normandy landings and afterward to support the rapid expansion of logistical transport ashore a modification was made to make standard Liberty vessels more suitable for mass transport of vehicles and in records are seen as "MT" for Motor Transport vessels. As MTs four holds were loaded with vehicles while the fifth was modified to house the drivers and assistants.

The modifications into troop transports also were not given special type designations.

Propulsion

By 1941, the steam turbine was the preferred marine steam engine because of its greater efficiency compared to earlier reciprocating compound steam engines. Steam turbine engines required very precise manufacturing techniques and balancing and a complicated reduction gear, however, and the companies capable of manufacturing them already were committed to the large construction program for warships. Therefore, a 140-ton vertical triple expansion steam engine of obsolete design was selected to power Liberty ships because it was cheaper and easier to build in the numbers required for the Liberty ship program and because more companies could manufacture it. Eighteen different companies eventually built the engine. It had the additional advantage of ruggedness and simplicity. Parts manufactured by one company were interchangeable with those made by another, and the openness of its design made most of its moving parts easy to see, access, and oil.

Construction
The ships were constructed of sections that were welded together. This is similar to the technique used by Palmer's at Jarrow, northeast England, but substituted welding for riveting. Riveted ships took several months to construct. The work force was newly trained—no one had previously built welded ships. As America entered the war, the shipbuilding yards employed women, to replace men who were enlisting in the armed forces.

The ships initially had a poor public image owing to their appearance. In a speech announcing the emergency shipbuilding program President Franklin D. Roosevelt had referred to the ship as "a dreadful looking object", and Time magazine called it an "Ugly Duckling". 27 September 1941 was dubbed Liberty Fleet Day to try to assuage public opinion, since the first 14 "Emergency" vessels were launched that day. In remarks at the launch ceremony FDR cited Patrick Henry's 1775 speech that finished "Give me liberty or give me death". Roosevelt said that this new class of ship would bring liberty to Europe, which gave rise to the name Liberty ship.

The first ships required about 230 days to build (Patrick Henry took 244 days), but the median production time per ship dropped to 39 days by 1943. The ships were made assembly-line style, from prefabricated sections. In 1943 three Liberty ships were completed daily. They were usually named after famous Americans, starting with the signatories of the Declaration of Independence. 17 of the Liberty Ships were named in honor of outstanding African-Americans.

Any group that raised war bonds worth $2 million could propose a name. Most bore the names of deceased people.

Another Liberty ship that exploded was the rechristened , which caused the Texas City Disaster on 16 April 1947, killing at least 581 people.

Six Liberty ships were converted at Point Clear, Alabama, by the United States Army Air Force, into floating aircraft repair depots, operated by the Army Transport Service, starting in April 1944. The secret project, dubbed "Project Ivory Soap", provided mobile depot support for B-29 Superfortress bombers and P-51 Mustang fighters based on Guam, Iwo Jima, and Okinawa beginning in December 1944. The six ARU(F)s (Aircraft Repair Unit, Floating), however, were also fitted with landing platforms to accommodate four Sikorsky R-4 helicopters, where they provided medical evacuation of combat casualties in both the Philippine Islands and Okinawa.

She was named after the chief engineer of a United States Army freighter who had stayed below decks to shut down his engines after a 13 April 1945 explosion, an act that won him a posthumous Merchant Marine Distinguished Service Medal. The new ship was named , and served until scrapped in 1962.

Several designs of mass-produced petroleum tanker were also produced, the most numerous being the T2 tanker series, with about 490 built between 1942 and the end of 1945.

Problems

Hull cracks
Early Liberty ships suffered hull and deck cracks, and a few were lost due to such structural defects. During World War II there were nearly 1,500 instances of significant brittle fractures. Twelve ships, including three of the 2,710 Liberty ships built, broke in half without warning, including , which sank on 24 November 1943 with the loss of 10 lives. Suspicion fell on the shipyards, which had often used inexperienced workers and new welding techniques to produce large numbers of ships in great haste.

The Ministry of War Transport borrowed the British-built  for testing purposes. Constance Tipper of Cambridge University demonstrated that the fractures did not start in the welds, but were due to the embrittlement of the steel used; however, the same steel used in riveted construction did not have this problem. She discovered that at a certain temperature, the steel the ships were made from changed from being ductile to brittle. This allowed cracks to form and propagate. This temperature is known as the critical ductile-brittle transition temperature. Ships in the North Atlantic were exposed to temperatures that could fall below this critical point. The predominantly welded hull construction, effectively a continuous sheet of steel, allowed small cracks to propagate unimpeded, unlike in a hull made of separate plates riveted together. One common type of crack nucleated at the square corner of a hatch which coincided with a welded seam, both the corner and the weld acting as stress concentrators. Furthermore, the ships were frequently grossly overloaded, increasing stress, and some of the problems occurred during or after severe storms that would further have increased stress. Minor revisions to the hatches and various reinforcements were applied to the Liberty ships to arrest the cracking problem.

Service

Use as troopships

In September 1943 strategic plans and shortage of more suitable hulls required that Liberty ships be pressed into emergency use as troop transports with about 225 eventually converted for this purpose. The first general conversions were hastily undertaken by the War Shipping Administration (WSA) so that the ships could join convoys on the way to North Africa for Operation Torch. Even earlier the Southwest Pacific Area command's U.S. Army Services of Supply had converted at least one, in Australia into an assault troop carrier with landing craft (LCIs and LCVs) and troops with the ship being reconverted for cargo after the Navy was given exclusive responsibility for amphibious assault operations. Others in the Southwest Pacific were turned into makeshift troop transports for New Guinea operations by installing field kitchens on deck, latrines aft between #4 and #5 hatches flushed by hoses attached to fire hydrants and about 900 troops sleeping on deck or in 'tween deck spaces. While most of the Liberty ships converted were intended to carry no more than 550 troops, thirty-three were converted to transport 1,600 on shorter voyages from mainland U.S. ports to Alaska, Hawaii and the Caribbean.

The issue of hull cracks caused concern with the United States Coast Guard, which recommended that Liberty ships be withdrawn from troop carrying in February 1944 although military commitments required their continued use. The more direct problem was the general unsuitability of the ships as troop transports, particularly with the hasty conversions in 1943, that generated considerable complaints regarding poor mess, food and water storage, sanitation, heating / ventilation and a lack of medical facilities. After the Allied victory in North Africa, about 250 Liberty ships were engaged in transporting prisoners of war to the United States. By November 1943 the Army's Chief of Transportation, Maj. Gen. Charles P. Gross, and WSA, whose agents operated the ships, reached agreement on improvements, but operational requirements forced an increase of the maximum number of troops transported in a Liberty from 350 to 500. The increase in production of more suitable vessels did allow for returning the hastily converted Liberty ships to cargo-only operations by May 1944. Despite complaints, reservations, Navy requesting its personnel not travel aboard Liberty troopers and even Senate comment, the military necessities required use of the ships. The number of troops was increased to 550 on 200 Liberty ships for redeployment to the Pacific. The need for the troopship conversions persisted into the immediate postwar period in order to return troops from overseas as quickly as possible.

Combat

Ordered to stop, Stephen Hopkins refused to surrender, so the heavily armed German commerce raider  and her tender  with one machine gun opened fire. Although greatly outgunned, the crew of Stephen Hopkins fought back, replacing the Armed Guard crew of the ship's single  gun with volunteers as they fell. The fight was short, and both ships were wrecks.

The following year from 22 to 30 January 1944, Lawton B. Evans was involved in the Battle of Anzio in Italy. It was under repeated bombardment from shore batteries and aircraft for eight days. It endured a prolonged barrage of shelling, machine-gun fire and bombs. The ship shot down five German planes.

After the war

More than 2,400 Liberty ships survived the war. Of these, 835 made up the postwar cargo fleet. Greek entrepreneurs bought 526 ships and Italians bought 98. Shipping magnates including John Fredriksen, John Theodoracopoulos, Aristotle Onassis, Stavros Niarchos, Stavros George Livanos, the Goulandris brothers, and the Andreadis, Tsavliris, Achille Lauro, Grimaldi and Bottiglieri families were known to have started their fleets by buying Liberty ships. Andrea Corrado, the dominant Italian shipping magnate at the time, and leader of the Italian shipping delegation, rebuilt his fleet under the programme. Weyerhaeuser operated a fleet of six Liberty Ships (which were later extensively refurbished and modernized) carrying lumber, newsprint, and general cargo for years after the end of the war.

Some Liberty ships were lost after the war to naval mines that were inadequately cleared. Pierre Gibault was scrapped after hitting a mine in a previously cleared area off the Greek island of Kythira in June 1945, and the same month saw Colin P. Kelly Jnr take mortal damage from a mine hit off the Belgian port of Ostend. In August 1945, William J. Palmer was carrying horses from New York to Trieste when she rolled over and sank 15 minutes after hitting a mine a few miles from destination. All crew members, and six horses were saved. Nathaniel Bacon ran into a minefield off Civitavecchia, Italy in December 1945, caught fire, was beached, and broke in two; the larger section was welded onto another Liberty half hull to make a new ship 30 feet longer, named Boccadasse.

As late as December 1947, Robert Dale Owen, renamed Kalliopi and sailing under the Greek flag, broke in three and sank in the northern Adriatic Sea after hitting a mine. Other Liberty ships lost to mines after the end of the war include John Woolman, Calvin Coolidge, Cyrus Adler, and Lord Delaware.

On April 16, 1947, a Liberty ship owned by the Compagnie Générale Transatlantique called the Grandcamp (originally built as the SS Benjamin R. Curtis) docked in Texas City, Texas to load a cargo of 2,300 tons of ammonium nitrate fertilizer. A fire broke out on board which eventually caused the entire ammonium nitrate cargo to explode. The massive explosion levelled Texas City and caused fires which detonated more ammonium nitrate in a nearby ship and warehouse. It was one of the largest non-nuclear explosions in US history. This incident is known as the Texas City disaster today.

The ship was driven further onto the reef by rough waves and  winds, which collapsed the forward bow and damaged two forward holds. The crew was evacuated by the SS Frontenac Victory the following day. The salvage tug Ono arrived on December 25 to attempt to tow the ship clear, but persistent stormy weather forced a delay of the rescue attempt. On January 3, before another rescue attempt could be made, the ship's anchors tore loose and the Quartette was blown onto the reef, and deemed a total loss. Several weeks later, it snapped in half at the keel and the two pieces sank. The wreck site now serves as an artificial reef which provides a habitat for many fish species.

In 1953, the Commodity Credit Corporation (CCC), began storing surplus grain in Liberty ships located in the Hudson River, James River, Olympia, and Astoria National Defense Reserve Fleet's. In 1955, 22 ships in the Suisun Bay Reserve Fleet were withdrawn to be loaded with grain and were then transferred to the Olympia Fleet. In 1956, four ships were withdrawn from the Wilmington Fleet and transferred, loaded with grain, to the Hudson River Fleet.

Between 1955 and 1959, 16 former Liberty ships were repurchased by the United States Navy and converted to the s for the Atlantic and Pacific Barrier.

In the 1960s, three Liberty ships and two Victory ships were reactivated and converted to technical research ships with the hull classification symbol AGTR (auxiliary, technical research) and used to gather electronic intelligence and for radar picket duties by the United States Navy. The Liberty ships SS Samuel R. Aitken became , SS Robert W. Hart became , SS J. Howland Gardner became  with the Victory ships being  which became  and  becoming . All of these ships were decommissioned and struck from the Naval Vessel Register in 1969 and 1970.

USS Liberty was a Belmont-class technical research ship (electronic spy ship) that was attacked by Israel Defense Forces during the 1967 Six-Day War. She was built and served in World War II as SS Simmons Victory, as a Victory cargo ship.

From 1946 to 1963, the Pacific Ready Reserve Fleet – Columbia River Group, retained as many as 500 ships.

In 1946, Liberty ships were mothballed in the Hudson River Reserve Fleet near Tarrytown, New York. At its peak in 1965, 189 hulls were stored there. The last two were sold for scrap to Spain in 1971 and the reserve permanently shut down.

John W. Brown has had a long career as a school ship and many internal modifications, while Jeremiah O'Brien remains largely in her original condition. Both are museum ships that still put out to sea regularly. In 1994, Jeremiah O'Brien steamed from San Francisco to England and France for the 50th anniversary of D-Day, the only large ship from the original Operation Overlord fleet to participate in the anniversary. In 2008, a ship converted in 1944 into a pipe transport to support Operation Pluto, was transferred to Greece and converted to a floating museum dedicated to the history of the Greek merchant marine; although missing major components were restored this ship is no longer operational.

Liberty ships continue to serve in a "less than whole" function many decades after their launching.

 was converted into MH-1A (otherwise known as USS Sturgis). MH-1A was a floating nuclear power plant and the first ever built. MH-1A was used to generate electricity at the Panama Canal Zone from 1968 to 1975. She was also used as a fresh water generating plant. She is anchored in the James River Reserve Fleet. The ship was dismantled in 2019 in Brownsville, Texas.

Fifty-eight Liberty ships were lengthened by  starting in 1958, giving them additional carrying capacity at a small additional cost. The bridges of most of these were also enclosed in the mid-1960s in accordance with a design by naval architect Ion Livas.

Four ships were converted in the $11 million program. SS Benjamin Chew had its existing condensers modified and a new superheater and geared turbine installed to give the ship 6,000 shp, up from 2,500. SS Thomas Nelson had its bow lengthened, diesel engines installed in place of the original steam engine, and movable cranes outfitted in place of the original cargo handling gear. The GTS (Gas Turbine Ship) John Sergeant had its bow extended, and its steam engine replaced with a General Electric gas turbine of 6,600 shp, connected to a reversible pitch propeller via reduction gearing. John Sergeant was considered overall to be a success, but problems with the reversible pitch propeller ended its trial after three years. GTS William Patterson had its bow extended and its steam engine replaced with 6 General Electric GE-14 free-piston gas generators, connected to two reversible turbines and capable of 6,000 shp total. William Patterson was considered to be a failure as reliability was poor and the scalability of the design was poor. All four vessels were fueled with Bunker C fuel oil, though John Sergeant required a quality of fuel available at limited ports and also required further treatment to reduce contaminants. Three were scrapped in 1971 or 1972 and the diesel-equipped Thomas Nelson was scrapped in 1981.

In 2011, the United States Postal Service issued a postage stamp featuring the Liberty ship as part of a set on the U.S. Merchant Marine.

Shipyards
Liberty ships were built at eighteen shipyards located along the U.S. Atlantic, Pacific and Gulf coasts:
 Alabama Drydock and Shipbuilding, Mobile, Alabama
 Bethlehem-Fairfield Shipyard, Baltimore, Maryland
 California Shipbuilding Corp., Los Angeles, California
 Delta Shipbuilding Corp., New Orleans, Louisiana
 J.A. Jones Construction Company
 Panama City, Florida
 Brunswick, Georgia
 Kaiser Company, Vancouver, Washington
 Marinship, Sausalito, California
 New England Shipbuilding Corporation, South Portland, Maine The East and West Yards were both on the same  of shipyard. However, the two yards commenced operations under different titles and until early 1942 were separated by rigid legal conditions.
 East Yard
 West Yard
 North Carolina Shipbuilding Company, Wilmington, North Carolina
 Oregon Shipbuilding Corporation, Portland, Oregon
 Permanente Metals Corporation, Richmond, California (a Kaiser facility)
Kaiser Richmond No. 1 Yard
Kaiser Richmond No. 2 Yard
 St. Johns River Shipbuilding, Jacksonville, Florida
 Southeastern Shipbuilding Corporation, Savannah, Georgia
 Todd Houston Shipbuilding, Houston, Texas
 Walsh-Kaiser Co., Inc., Providence, Rhode Island
Small yard:
Rheem Manufacturing Company built one ship the SS William Coddington.

Survivors

There are four surviving Liberty Ships.
 operational and in use as a museum ship in Baltimore Harbor, Maryland
 operational and in use as a museum ship, docked at Pier 45, San Francisco, California
 transferred to Greece in 2008 and renamed Hellas Liberty. Restored for use as a maritime museum in Piraeus harbor, Greece.
 The last Liberty ship built, sold to private ownership in 1964 and renamed Star of Kodiak. Used as a fish cannery ship. She is currently landlocked but remains the headquarters of Trident Seafoods in Kodiak, Alaska.

Ships in class

 EC2-S-C1 dry cargo ships for Merchant Navy
Converted to troopships 220 ships
Converted to ammunition ships
EC2-S-C1 Acubens-class general stores issue ship 11 cargo ships for US Navy
EC2-S-C1 Crater-class cargo ship 65 cargo ships for US Navy
Chourre-class aircraft repair ship two US Navy ships (1944-1945)
Luzon-class Internal Combustion repair ship 12 conversions for US Navy
Xanthus-class repair ship five ships (1944-1946)
American Mariner-class ship, US Coast Guard training (1943-1950), Radar ship (1950-1964)
Operation Ivory Soap six conversions to US Army Air Force aircraft repair and maintenance ships in 1944
EC2-S-22a, conversions to remote control minesweeper 
 Z-ET1-S-C3, 18 Armadillo-class tankers for US Navy's fuel oil, or diesel or gasoline, Merchant Navy and US Navy
 Z-EC2-S-C2, eight Tank carriers, with larger hatches and a 30 tons crane. Built by J.A.Jones Construction in 1943 for Merchant Navy
 EC2-S-AW1 Collier, for coal transport, 24 built by Delta SB.
 Z-EC2-S-C5 Boxed aircraft transport with large larger hatches and 30 tons crane, 28 built by J.A.Jones Construction
Indus-class net cargo ships, USS Indus support of Net laying ships.(1943-1946)
Post war
Guardian-class radar picket ships 16 converted for US Navy use in 1955
 converted to the first floating nuclear power plant (1967-1976)
EC2-S-8a  converted to a high-speed cargo ship in 1956
EC2-M-8b,  converted to a high-speed cargo ship in 1956
Jumbo Liberty ship, in the 1950s some Liberty ships were lengthened in Japan. The SS Henry M. Stephens became the SS Andros Fairplay.
LNG, Liquid Natural Gas Carrier conversion by Howaldtswerke Deutsche Werft AG at Kiel, Germany. Example  to SS Ultragaz São Paulo in 1952, scrapped in 1972.
SS William P McArthur was converted to a floating crane in 1966.
 converted to a pipe carrier in 1944, then cable carrier for AT&T in 1956, then and a museum ship in Greece in 2008.
Floating dock conversions:  in 1968 and S Jane Addams in 1947.

See also

 Allied technological cooperation during World War II
 Empire ships
 Hog Islander, WW I-designed American cargo ship design that served in WW II
 List of Liberty ships
 Fort ship
 Park ship
 Type C2 ship
 Type T2 tanker
 U.S. Merchant Marine Academy
 Victory ship
 World War II United States Merchant Navy

Notes

References

Sources
 
 
  
 
   Total pages: 280

Further reading
 
 Chiles, James R  "The Ships That Broke Hilter's Blockade: How a crash effort by amateur shipbuilders turned out twenty-seven hundred Liberty freighters in four years" Winter 1988, Volume 3, Issue 3. Invention and Technology Magazine at American Heritage
 Lee, Bill "The Liberty Ships of World War II" An informative 30-page article about the ships, how they were built, and how they were used.

External links

youtube How A Cargo Ship Helped Win WW2: The Liberty Ship Story
 SS Jeremiah O'Brien, Liberty museum ship moored at Fisherman's Wharf, San Francisco, California
 Liberty Ships built by the United States Maritime Commission in World War II 
 Liberty Ships and Victory Ships, America's Lifeline in War A lesson on Liberty ships and Victory ships from the National Park Service's Teaching with Historic Places.
 Ships for Victory: J.A. Jones Construction Company and Liberty Ships in Brunswick, Georgia Eighty-four black-and-white photographs from the J.A. Jones Construction Company collection at the Brunswick-Glynn County Library that depict the company's World War II cargo ship building activities in its Brunswick, Georgia shipyard from 1943 to 1945.
 Project Liberty Ship – The Shipyards. 
 Summary of Constance Tipper's workcontains remarkable photo of fractured Liberty ship still afloat.
 Danger presented by the wreck of liberty ship .
  Shipbuilding under the United States Maritime Commission, 1936 to 1950
 Liberty Ships and World War II – A Role Model
 The Last Liberty Ship: Kaiser (video)
 Brunswick's "Liberty Ships" historical marker

 
Ship types
Articles containing video clips